Acacia graciliformis, also known as Koolanooka Delicate wattle, is a shrub of the genus Acacia and the subgenus Plurinerves that is endemic to a small area in western Australia.

Description
Like most species of Acacia it has phyllodes rather than true leaves. Following flowering seed pods form that have a linear to narrowly oblong shape and are moderately to strongly curved and sometimes coiled. The glossy dark brown seeds inside have an oblong elliptic shape with a white aril.

Taxonomy
The species was first formally described by the botanists Bruce Maslin and Carrie Buscumb in 2007 as a part of the work Two new species of Acacia (Leguminosae: Mimosoideae) from the Koolanooka Hills in the northern wheatbelt region of south-west Western Australia as published in the journal Nuytsia.

Distribution
It is native to a small area in the Wheatbelt region of Western Australia where it commonly situated on gentle slopes on low hills and around rocky outcrops of basalt or ironstone growing in stony clay loam soils.

See also
 List of Acacia species

References

graciliformis
Acacias of Western Australia
Taxa named by Bruce Maslin
Plants described in 2007